The canton of Lourdes-2 is an administrative division of the Hautes-Pyrénées department, southwestern France. It was created at the French canton reorganisation which came into effect in March 2015. Its seat is in Lourdes.

It consists of the following communes:
 
Adé
Les Angles
Arrayou-Lahitte
Arcizac-ez-Angles
Arrodets-ez-Angles
Artigues
Berbérust-Lias
Bourréac
Cheust
Escoubès-Pouts
Gazost
Ger
Germs-sur-l'Oussouet
Geu
Gez-ez-Angles
Jarret
Julos
Juncalas
Lézignan
Lourdes (partly)
Lugagnan
Ossun-ez-Angles
Ourdis-Cotdoussan
Ourdon
Ousté
Paréac
Saint-Créac
Sère-Lanso

References

Cantons of Hautes-Pyrénées